Eupithecia arenaria is a moth in the  family Geometridae. It is found in Peru.

References

Moths described in 1907
arenaria
Moths of South America